The Ethiopian–Adal War or Abyssinian-Adal War, also known in Arabic as the "Futuḥ al-Ḥabash" (conquest of Abyssinia), was a military conflict between the Christian Ethiopian Empire and the Muslim Adal Sultanate from 1529 to 1543. Christian Ethiopian troops consisted of the Amhara then afterwards their allies, the Tigrayans, and Agaw people, and at the closing of the war, supported by a few hundred Portuguese musketmen. While Adal forces were made up of the ruling Harari, (formally known as Harla) and their coalition army made up of Somali, Afar, Argobba, Hadiya, and tens of thousands of Turkish and Arab gunmen that joined from the beginning of the conflict. Both sides at times would see the Maya mercenaries join their ranks.

Background
Imam Ahmad ibn Ibrahim al-Ghazi was a military leader of the medieval Adal Sultanate in the northern Horn of Africa. Between 1529 and 1543, who embarked on a conquest referred to as the Futuh Al-Habash, which brought three-quarters of Christian Abyssinia under the power of the Muslim Sultanate of Adal. With an army which composed of Afar, Harari, and Somalis. Al-Ghazi's forces, using bows and arrows, and their Ottoman allies came close to extinguishing the ancient Ethiopian kingdom. However, the Abyssinians managed to secure the assistance of Cristóvão da Gama's Portuguese troops and maintain their domain's autonomy. Both polities in the process exhausted their resources and manpower, which resulted in the contraction of both powers and changed regional dynamics for centuries to come.  Many historians trace the origins of hostile Ethiopia–Somalia relations to this war.  Some scholars also argue that this conflict proved, through their use on both sides, the value of firearms such as the matchlock musket, cannons, and the arquebus over traditional weapons.

Course of the war
In 1529, Imam Ahmad's Adal troops defeated a larger Ethiopian contingent at the Battle of Shimbra Kure. The victory came at a heavy cost but it solidified the Adal forces' morale, providing proof that they could stand up to the sizable Ethiopian army.

The victories that gave the followers of Imam Ahmad the upper hand came in 1531. The first was at Antukyah, where cannon fire at the start of the battle panicked the Ethiopian soldiers. The second was on 28 October at Amba Sel, when troops under the Imam not only defeated but dispersed the Ethiopian army and captured items of the Imperial regalia. These victories allowed the Adalites to enter the Ethiopian highlands, where they began to sack and burn numerous churches, including Atronsa Maryam, where the remains of several Emperors had been interred.

Dawit II died in 1540 and his son Menas and the future emperor was captured by the forces of Imam Ahmad; the Empress was unable to react as she was besieged in the capital. In 1543, a smaller number of Abyssinians soundly defeated the larger Adal-Ottoman army with the help of the Portuguese navy, which brought 400 musketeers led by Cristóvão da Gama via Massawa, a port in the Eritrean Kingdom of Medri Bahri, an important port today in present-day Eritrea. However, Da Gama was captured in the battle of Battle of Wofla and later killed.

The 500 musketeers were led by Bahri Negassi Yeshaq, king of Medri Bahri. Yeshaq not only provided the Portuguese with provisions and places to camp in his realm but also information about the land. The Bahri Negassi also joined Emperor Gelawdewos and the Portuguese in the decisive Battle of Wayna Daga, where tradition states that Ahmad was shot in the chest by a Portuguese musketeer, named João de Castilho, who had charged alone into the Muslim lines and died. The wounded Imam was then beheaded by an Ethiopian cavalry commander, named Azmach Calite. Once the Imam's soldiers learned of his death, they fled the battlefield. The death of Imam Ahmed and the victory in the Battle of Wayna Daga caused a collapse of Ahmed forces and forced a Adalite retreat from Ethiopia.

Emir Nur ibn Mujahid succeeded his uncle Ahmad ibn Ibrahim al-Ghazi as leader of the Adal forces and consolidated his power by marrying Bati del Wambara. In 1559, Emir Nur's cavalry defeated and killed Emperor Gelawdewos in battle, and sacked the Abyssinian town of Waj.
Simultaneously, Abyssinian General Ras Hamalmal sacked the Adalite capital Harar, captured Sultan Barakat ibn Umar Din and executed him, thus ending the Walashma Dynasty.

J. Spencer Trimingham postulates that the captured Barakat ibn Umar Din was in fact returned to Adal in exchange for Prince Menas in negotiations led by Bati del Wambara. Emir Nur ibn Mujahid, returning from his campaign, would display the head of Emperor Gelawdewos in Harar as a show of triumph. In 1577, Emperor Sarsa Dengel defeated, captured and executed Sultan Muhammad V in Bale. He was succeeded by Imam Muhammad Jasa, a relative of Ahmad ibn Ibrahim al-Ghazi, who relocated Adal's capital to Aussa. while Susenyos I relocated the capital of Abyssinia to Gondar.

Aftermath
Mohammed Hassan has plausibly argued that because this conflict severely weakened both participants, it provided an opportunity for the Oromo people to migrate into the historically Gafat land of Welega south of the Blue Nile and eastward to the walls of Harar, establishing new territories.

See also
 Ajuran-Portuguese wars
 Ottoman–Portuguese conflicts (1538–1559)
 History of Somaliland
 History of Ethiopia
 Ethiopian–Somali conflict
 Battle of Hubat

References

Adal Sultanate
Conflicts in 1543
16th-century conflicts
16th century in Ethiopia
Conflicts in 1529
History of Ethiopia
Military history of Somaliland
Military history of Africa
Wars involving the states and peoples of Africa
Wars involving Ethiopia
Wars involving Portugal
Wars involving Somaliland
1543 endings
1529 beginnings